The Vranje shooting was a mass shooting that occurred on June 3, 1993 in Vranje, Pčinja District, Yugoslavia. The shooting took place in the South Morava Brigade barracks of the Yugoslav Army. Private Jožef Meneder escaped from a detention cell, attacked a security guard and confiscated his weapon. He then killed six privates and one ensign, and wounded four more privates, before shooting and killing himself.

Perpetrator
Jožef Meneder was born in Subotica in 1974. According to his neighbors, he was very aggressive. Acquaintances described him as a dark and painful individual. He used to be a carpenter up until joining the army. His acquaintances said that he was a member of a death metal band, and members of this group held parties at the cemetery. He had an inverted cross tattoo. On his left forearm he had a tattoo with the date of shooting. He belonged to the Bad Faith cult, which had its origins in the Black Roses cult. Satanic symbols, including postcards about Bad Faith, were found in his room in his parents' house. A month before the shooting, a security report said he could do something undesirable.

See also
Paraćin massacre

References

Crimes involving Satanism or the occult
June 1993 events in Europe
Mass murder in 1993
1993 in Yugoslavia
1993 mass shootings in Europe
Mass shootings in Yugoslavia